"The Wrong Girl" is a song written by Liz Rose and Pat McLaughlin, and recorded by American country music artist Lee Ann Womack.  It was released in February 2004 as the first and only single from her Greatest Hits compilation album.  The song peaked at number 24 on the Billboard Hot Country Singles & Tracks.

Critical reception
Michael Paoletta of Billboard gave the song a positive review and wrote, "Womack has one of the most glorious country female voices to come along since Tammy Wynette and Loretta Lynn. Like those legendary predecessors, she has a knack for combining vulnerability and sassy strength. Womack is the right girl for country radio, and this is the right song."

Chart performance

References

2004 songs
2004 singles
Lee Ann Womack songs
Songs written by Liz Rose
Songs written by Pat McLaughlin
Song recordings produced by Frank Liddell
MCA Nashville Records singles